The Journal of Materials Chemistry C is a weekly peer-reviewed scientific journal covering the properties, applications, and synthesis of new materials related to optical, magnetic and electronic devices. It is one of the three journals created from the splitting of Journal of Materials Chemistry at the end of 2012. Its first issue was published in January 2013. The journal is published by the Royal Society of Chemistry and has two sister journals, Journal of Materials Chemistry A and Journal of Materials Chemistry B. The editor-in-chief for the Journal of Materials Chemistry family of journals is currently Nazario Martin. The deputy editor-in-chief for Journal of Materials Chemistry C is Natalie Stingelin.

Abstracting and indexing 
The journal is abstracted and indexed in the Science Citation Index.

See also
List of scientific journals in chemistry
 Materials Horizons
 Journal of Materials Chemistry A
 Journal of Materials Chemistry B

References

External links
 

Chemistry journals
Materials science journals
Royal Society of Chemistry academic journals
Weekly journals
Publications established in 2013
English-language journals